The Libre Computer Project is an effort initiated by Shenzhen Libre Technology Co., Ltd., with the goal of producing standards-compliant single-board computers (SBC) and upstream software stack to power them.

Hardware 

Libre Computer Project uses crowd-funding on Indiegogo and Kickstarter to market their SBC designs. The delivery and after-sales support was poor resulting in lots of complaints and dissatisfied funders.   

Active Libre Computer SBC designs include:

ROC-RK3328-CC (Renegade) 

The ROC-RK3328-CC "Renegade" board was funded on Indiegogo and features the following specifications:

 Rockchip RK3328 SoC
 4 ARM Cortex-A53 @ 1.4GHz
 Cryptography Extensions
 2G + 2P ARM Mali-450 @ 500MHz
 OpenGL ES 1.1 / 2.0
 OpenVG 1.1
 Multi-Media Processor
 Decoders
 VP9 P2 4K60
 H.265 M10P @ L5.1 4K60
 H.264 H10P @ L5.1 4K60
 JPEG
 Encoders
 H.265 1080P30 or 2x H.264 720P30
 H.264 1080P30 or 2x H.264 720P30
 Up to 4GB DDR4-2133 SDRAM
 2 USB 2.0 Type A
 1 USB 3.0 Type A
 Gigabit Ethernet
 3.5mm TRRS AV Jack
 HDMI 2.0
 MicroUSB Power In
 MicroSD Card Slot with UHS support
 eMMC Interface with 5.x support
 IR Receiver
 U-Boot Button
 40 Pin Low Speed Header (PWM, I2C, SPI, GPIO)
 ADC Header
 Power Enable/On Header

AML-S905X-CC (Le Potato) 

The AML-S905X-CC "Le Potato" board was funded on Kickstarter on 24 July 2017 and features the following specifications:

 Amlogic S905X SoC
 4 ARM Cortex-A53 @ 1.512GHz
 Cryptography Extension
 2G + 3P ARM Mali-450 @ 750MHz
 OpenGL ES 1.1 / 2.0
 OpenVG 1.1
 Amlogic Video Engine 10
 Decoders
 VP9 P2 4K60
 H.265 MP10@L5.1 4K60
 H.264 HP@L5.1 4K30
 JPEG / MJPEG
 Encoders
 H.264 1080P60
 JPEG
 Up to 2GB DDR3 SDRAM
 4 USB 2.0 Type A
 100 Mb Fast Ethernet
 3.5mm TRRS AV Jack
 HDMI 2.0
 MicroUSB Power In
 MicroSD Card Slot
 eMMC Interface
 IR Receiver
 U-Boot Button
 40 Pin Low Speed Header (PWM, I2C, SPI, GPIO)
 Audio Headers (I2S, ADC, SPDIF)
 UART Header

NOTE: GPIO Header Pin 11 or HDMI CEC is selectable by onboard jumper. They can not be used at the same time since they share the same pad.

ALL-H3-CC (Tritium) 

The "Tritium" board was funded on Kickstarter on 13 January 2018 with the following specifications:

Software

Operating systems

Open Source

Software 
Libre Computer is focused on upstream support in open-source software using standardized API interfaces. This includes Linux, u-boot, LibreELEC RetroArch, and more. A variety of open-source operating systems may be used on Libre Computer boards, including Linux and Android.  Few to no binary blobs are used to boot and operate the boards.

Hardware 
Schematics and 2D silkscreen are available for all hardware. Design files are based on non-disclosure materials from SoC vendors. CAD files are not available.

See also 

 Comparison of single-board computers
 List of open-source hardware projects
 OLinuXino
 BeagleBoard
 Raspberry Pi

References 

Open-source hardware
Microcomputers
Motherboard companies
Single-board computers